Salisbury (formerly known as South Westbury) is a hamlet and census-designated place (CDP) in the Town of Hempstead in Nassau County, on Long Island, in New York, United States. The population was 12,093 at the 2010 census. 

Many Levitt style homes lie adjacent to Eisenhower Park (formerly known as Salisbury Park).

It is served by the Westbury Railroad Station of the Long Island Railroad and shares fire districts with Westbury and East Meadow.

History 
Salisbury is so named because it sits on a broad, flat section of the larger Hempstead Plains that reminded late 19th Century Long Islanders of the Salisbury Plain in England, where Stonehenge is located. This name was made the CDP's official name for the 1990 census, replacing the older name of South Westbury (which referenced its geographic location immediately south of Westbury).

Geography 

According to the United States Census Bureau, the CDP has a total area of 1.7 square miles (4.5 km2), of which 1.7 square miles (4.5 km2) is land and 0.57% is water.

Demographics 

At the 2000 census, there were 12,341 people, 4,015 households and 3,340 families residing in the CDP. The population density was 7,164.1 per square mile (2,770.3/km2). There were 4,052 housing units at an average density of 2,352.3/sq mi (909.6/km2). The racial makeup of the CDP was 89.94% White, 1.03% African American, 0.14% Native American, 5.97% Asian, 0.01% Pacific Islander, 1.60% from other races, and 1.31% from two or more races. Hispanic or Latino people of any race were 8.56% of the population.

There were 4,015 households, of which 37.2% had children under the age of 18 living with them, 69.9% were married couples living together, 10.4% had a female householder with no husband present, and 16.8% were non-families. 13.9% of all households were made up of individuals, and 8.3% had someone living alone who was 65 years of age or older. The average household size was 3.06 and the average family size was 3.35.

Age distribution was with 24.4% under the age of 18, 7.1% from 18 to 24, 28.2% from 25 to 44, 24.7% from 45 to 64, and 15.6% who were 65 years of age or older. The median age was 39 years. For every 100 females, there were 93.0 males. For every 100 females age 18 and over, there were 89.5 males.

The median household income was $73,641, and the median family income was $81,110. Males had a median income of $50,503 versus $37,002 for females. The per capita income for the CDP was $27,579. About 1.9% of families and 3.7% of the population were below the poverty line, including 3.5% of those under age 18 and 4.3% of those age 65 or over.

Education 
Salisbury is located primarily located within the boundaries of (and is thus served by) the East Meadow Union Free School District, although a small portion zoned for commercial use is within the Uniondale Union Free School District. As such, all children who reside within Salisbury and attend public schools go to East Meadow's schools.

References

External links 

 East Meadow Chamber of Commerce official website

Hempstead, New York
Census-designated places in New York (state)
Hamlets in New York (state)
Census-designated places in Nassau County, New York
Hamlets in Nassau County, New York